Truth and Lies is the eighth studio album by the Levellers. It includes the singles "Make You Happy" and "Last Man Alive".

Track listing
"Last Man Alive" – 3:07
"Make You Happy" – 3:45
"Confess" – 4:49
"For Us All" – 3:28
"Knot Around the World" – 3:31
"Steel Knife" – 4:21
"Wheels" – 3:48
"Said and Done" – 3:11
"Who's the Daddy" – 3:51
"The Damned" – 4:01
"Sleeping" – 5:33

Personnel

Musicians
 Mark Chadwick - guitars, vocals
 Charlie Heather - drums/percussion
 Jeremy Cunningham - bass guitar, artwork
 Simon Friend - guitars, vocals, mandolin
 Jonathan Sevink - fiddle
 Matt Savage - keyboard

References

External links
 
 

Levellers (band) albums
2005 albums